Creality, officially known as Shenzhen Creality 3D Technology Co, Ltd., is a Chinese 3D printer manufacturing company established in 2014, with headquarters located in Shenzhen.

Creality was jointly launched by Chen Chun, Ao Danjun, Liu Huilin, and Tang Jingke. Its main products are consumer-grade 3D printers and industrial-grade 3D printers.

History
In January 2020, Creality launched their 3D printing platform Creality Cloud.

On February 8, 2020, Creality shared the open source files of its development of 3D printed masks and goggles.

In April 2021, the company launched an entry-level 2K monochrome resin 3D printer.

In March 2022, Creality was sued by Artec for allegedly plagiarizing Artec Studio's software code. The case was filed in the New York Eastern District Court on March 25 and is still pending.

Controversy 

Creality has a history of GPL violations around the Marlin firmware and other GPL software. The first documented case is from 2018, and Creality continued this behavior until at least 2022.

External links
 Official website

References

Companies established in 2014
3D printer companies
Companies based in Shenzhen
Chinese brands